is a mountain located in the Kabato Mountains of Tōbetsu, Hokkaidō, Japan.

Climbing routes
There are three hiking courses known as A, B, and C.

References

Kamuishiri